The 1848 United States presidential election in South Carolina took place on November 7, 1848, as part of the 1848 United States presidential election. The state legislature chose 9 representatives, or electors to the Electoral College, who voted for President and Vice President.

South Carolina cast 9 electoral votes for the Democratic candidate Lewis Cass. These electors were chosen by the South Carolina General Assembly, the state legislature, rather than by popular vote.

Results

References

South Carolina
1848
1848 South Carolina elections